Agencies are a type of administrative division:

 Agencies of British India, which grouped the autonomous princely states
 Agencies of Pakistan, the main subdivisions of the Federally Administered Tribal Areas

Types of administrative division